Another Dawn is a 2010 album by the Southern California-based American Celtic rock band Tempest.

Critical reception

AllMusic gave the album a positive review saying that Tempest had successfully "reinvent[ed] themselves by blending contemporary and traditional sounds."

Track listing

References

2010 albums
Tempest (band) albums
Magna Carta Records albums